MV Xue Long 2 is a Chinese icebreaking research vessel that entered service in 2019.

History
The 5 million euro design contract for China's first domestically-built polar research vessel was signed in 2012 with the Finnish engineering company Aker Arctic, though construction did not begin until December 2016. She was built at Jiangnan Shipyard.

Xue Long 2 now in service both as a supply vessel for China's research facilities in the Arctic and Antarctic regions and as a research vessel, with capabilities for geological and biological experimentation and surveying.

Design
She has a displacement of 14,300 tonnes.

References

Icebreakers of China
Research vessels of China
2018 ships